Tord Gösta Magnuson (born 7 April 1941) is a Swedish business executive and the consul general for Mauritius. He is married to Princess Christina of Sweden, the youngest of the older sisters of King Carl XVI Gustaf. With the deaths of John Ambler in 2008, Prince Johann Georg of Hohenzollern in 2016 and Baron Niclas Silfverschiöld in 2017, Magnuson is the only living brother-in-law of Carl XVI Gustaf.

Magnuson is the son of Lennart Magnuson (MSE) and his wife Gerda (born Klemming), the grandson of the Swedish chemist Gunnar Magnuson and great-grandson of Swedish politician Tord Magnuson.

Magnuson graduated as reserve officer in 1963 and graduated with a B.Sc. from Stockholm University in 1967. During his career he has been working at Stockholms Enskilda Bank, at Sandvik Steel Inc. in New York City, at Kayel AB, as well as having been CEO of Devisa AB. He is representative of Air Mauritius in Sweden and Commander 1st Class of the Royal Order of Vasa.

Marriage and family
Magnuson and his wife first met in 1961. They married on 15 June 1974. As a result of her constitutionally unapproved marriage to Magnuson, she lost her style of Royal Highness and received the courtesy title of Princess Christina, Mrs. Magnuson. They have three sons: Carl Gustaf Victor (b. 1975), an economist; Tord Oscar Frederik (born 1977), an eyewear designer; and Victor Edmund Lennart (born 1980), a game designer.

Honours and awards

National honours
 : Commander 1st Class of the Royal Order of Vasa
 : Recipient of H.M The King's Medal, Gold 12th in Size
 : Recipient of the 50th Birthday Medal of King Carl XVI Gustaf
 : Recipient of the Wedding Medal of Crown Princess Victoria to Daniel Westling
 : Recipient of the King Carl XVI Gustaf Ruby Jubilee Medal
 : Recipient of the 70th Birthday Medal of King Carl XVI Gustaf

Foreign honours
 : Officer of the Order of the Legion of Honour
 : Grand Honorary Cross with Star of the Order of the Crown (11 October 2022)

Award
 : Sir Grand Cross of the Social Grand Order of the Amaranth

References

1941 births
Living people
Businesspeople from Stockholm
Stockholm University alumni
Chevaliers of the Légion d'honneur
Swedish business executives
20th-century Swedish businesspeople
21st-century Swedish businesspeople
Commanders of the Order of Vasa
Grand Crosses of the Order of the Crown (Netherlands)